The Lost Trail Station, in Hinsdale County, Colorado near Creede, Colorado, was built in 1877.  It was listed on the National Register of Historic Places in 2011.

It operated as a stagecoach station from 1877 to about 1895.

John Barber and his wife offered food and lodging to stagecoach travelers there.  A large log barn was built.

The listing included three contributing buildings and three contributing sites.

It is located at 81125 Forest Service Road 520.

References

Log buildings and structures on the National Register of Historic Places in Colorado
National Register of Historic Places in Hinsdale County, Colorado
Buildings and structures completed in 1877
1877 establishments in Colorado